Berberis heterophylla  is an evergreen shrub of the family Berberidaceae. It is endemic to Argentina and Chile. Is very similar to Berberis microphylla, hindering its recognition.

External links 
 Berberis heterophylla from Instituto Nacional de Tecnología Agropecuaria (Argentina)
 Berberis heterophylla at Plants for a future

heterophylla
Flora of Argentina
Flora of southern Chile
Endemic flora of Chile
Berries
Crops originating from Argentina
Crops originating from Chile

es:Berberis heterophylla